Yanina may refer to:

Irina Yanina - a Russian nurse, medical sergeant
Janusz Iwański — a Polish musician
Yanina Aguilar - a Costa Rican beach-volleyball player
Yanina Batyrchina - a Russian gymnast, Olympic silver (rhythmic gymnastics)
Yanina González - a Paraguayan beauty pageant contestant
Yanina Iannuzzi - an Argentine fencer
Yanina Wickmayer - a Belgian professional tennis player
Yanina Zhejmo - a Soviet actress

See also
Ioannina - Greek city alternatively called Jannena
Janina Karolchyk-Pravalinskaya